The  is a railway route operated by the Japanese private railway operator Kōnan Railway in Aomori Prefecture, from Hirosaki Station in Hirosaki to Kuroishi Station in Kuroishi.

Station list

 Tamboāto Station is open from April to November only.

Rolling stock

Rolling stock on the line consists of former Tokyu 6000 and 7000 series EMUs. Ex-Nankai Railway 1521 series 4-door EMUs were also previously used, but these were withdrawn in 2008 following the discontinuation of limited-stop "Rapid" services. An electric locomotive is also available for use on winter snow-clearing duties.

History
The Kōnan Railway was founded on March 27, 1926, and began operations between Hirosaki and Tsugaru-Onoe Station on September 7, 1927. On July 1, 1948, the line was electrified at 600 volts DC. The line was extended to Kōnan-Kuroishi Station (present-day Kuroishi Station) on July 1, 1950. Voltage on the line was raised to 750 volts on April 1, 1954, and to 1,500 volts on September 1, 1961.

Freight services ceased in 1984.

Former connecting lines
 Kuroishi station - The  line to Kawabe on the Ou Main Line was opened in 1912 by the JGR, transferred to the Konan Railway Co. in 1984, the year that freight services ceased, and closed in 1998.

Accidents
A train derailed at Hiraka Station on June 12, 2007, but no injuries were reported.

References
This article incorporates material from the corresponding article in the Japanese Wikipedia

 Harris, Ken and Clarke, Jackie. Jane's World Railways 2008-2009. Jane's Information Group (2008).

External links
 Konan Railway website 

Railway lines in Japan
Rail transport in Aomori Prefecture
1067 mm gauge railways in Japan
Railway lines opened in 1927